The Voice – Magyarország hangja ("Voice of Hungary" in English) is a Hungarian reality competition aimed to find new singing talent. Based on the reality singing competition The Voice of Holland, it is part of an international series created by Dutch television producer John de Mol. The first season was broadcast on TV2 from October 12, 2012 to January 25, 2013, as its first HD-quality show.

The Hungarian version of the show follows the original Dutch The Voice of Holland set of rules used by the show program. The show's arrival was originally announced in 2012, on the season 6 finale of Megasztár.

The show's the deadline to apply was July 13, 2012. 24 hours. The előválogatókat between 18 July 2012 and 20 July Art Gallery held.

The show's official website online as held hearings from which the better bekerülhettek before the Masters. The productions have been placed on the method and the sound performance of the website editors evaluated, which consists of a two-point score. The website visitors can also evaluate the production of, some of which can only be viewed.

On 3 February 2023, it was announced, that The Voice will return to Hungary with a second season, only this time will be broadcast on RTL.

Format
During the pre-selection of candidates to the program makers select the best 150 singers who get into the auditions.

The specialty of pickups to take up the singer back to back in the Masters, and will only occur if the current voice of a singer you like them. A master's reversal is enough to get someone on the válogatóról. The Masters in ledfal under the seating position where the foreign version of "I Want You", Hungarian version of "I need you" is displayed.

If the driver is just a masterpiece turns while singing, you will be automatically turned the master team, more people, possibly all four turns critic, the competitor will select which team you want to be a master.

The argument has been dueling circuits, each team has its own master. The master himself paired racers and shares itself decides what to do with the duel. After the duel of the jury members to decide whom to allocate more of the live show into the actual duel.

During the live shows of singers they are sizing up one another to live only a two masters team to participate. The two master schedule, that is, which team will be the master Whose team pairing will be included in a steady performance. At the end of every live show they will decide the fate of four men and two master lecture in a man escapes, while the other falls. This continued until all four master rider remains only two, they participate in the 8 finals, each rider is a master (who (audience & judges) has fewer total votes) are eliminated. The remaining one of the four singers taking part in the finals, in the finale (in which each of the four participating in a master, one of the best).

Coaches' teams
 Winner
 Runner-up
 Third place
 Fourth place

Season summary

Series overview

 Team Ferenc
 Team Andrea
 Team Tomás
 Team Mihály

Coaches

References

Hungarian reality television series
Hungary
TV2 (Hungarian TV channel) original programming